{{DISPLAYTITLE:C27H29NO11}}
The molecular formula C27H29NO11 (molar mass: 543.52 g/mol, exact mass: 543.1741 u) may refer to:

 Doxorubicin, a drug used in cancer chemotherapy
 Epirubicin, an anthracycline drug used for chemotherapy